Host Controller Interface or Host controller interface may refer to:

 Host Controller Interface (FireWire), an interface that enables a FireWire host controller to communicate with a driver
 Host Controller Interface (USB), an interface that enables a USB host controller to communicate with a driver
 Host Controller Interface (Bluetooth) in Bluetooth protocols
 Host Controller Interface (non-volatile memory), an interface that enables SATA Express / NVM Express SSDs to communicate with a driver

See also
Host adapter
Advanced Host Controller Interface (AHCI)
Enhanced Host Controller Interface (EHCI)
Non-Volatile Memory Host Controller Interface (NVMHCI)
Open Host Controller Interface (OHCI)
Universal Host Controller Interface (UHCI)
Wireless Host Controller Interface (WHCI)
Extensible Host Controller Interface (XHCI)

Interfaces